The Flathead Alps,  el. , is a small mountain range northeast of Seeley Lake, Montana in northeastern Powell County, Montana. The range is located primarily within the Bob Marshall Wilderness.

See also
 List of mountain ranges in Montana

Notes

Mountain ranges of Montana
Landforms of Powell County, Montana